Elgen Marion Long (August 12, 1927 – January 26, 2022) was an American aviator and author who set fifteen aviation records and firsts, including his 1971 flight around the world over both poles.  He received the FAI Gold Air Medal for his accomplishment.  He developed a "Crash and Sink" theory explaining the disappearance of Amelia Earhart. For over 35 years, Long researched the last leg of Earhart's flight in an attempt to determine where her Lockheed Electra crashed.  He and his wife Marie K. Long documented the people and data involved in the disappearance, a collection that is held by the SeaWord Foundation.

Accomplishments 

Elgen co-wrote Amelia Earhart: The Mystery Solved with his late wife Marie Katherine Long, published in 1999. Long is the originator and leading proponent of the book's "Crash and Sink" theory explaining Amelia Earhart's disappearance. Long believes that, relatively near to Howland Island, the Electra ran out of fuel and Earhart and her navigator Fred Noonan ditched at sea.
 
Movie rights to the book were purchased for Fox Searchlight Studios and Long was hired as technical consultant for the major motion picture titled Amelia (2009).  The screenplay was written by Ron Bass.  Two time Best Actress Oscar winner Hilary Swank stars as Amelia Earhart with Richard Gere cast as her husband George Palmer Putnam.  Filming of the epic movie was under the direction of Mira Nair mainly at sites in Canada and South Africa.  Amelia was released in late 2009.
 
In 1971, Long flew solo around the world over both the North and South Poles in a Piper Navajo, setting fifteen world records and firsts. Long was the first man to have crossed Antarctica alone via the South Pole.  He was also the first to use inertial navigation in crossing the Antarctic Continent.  For those feats, he was awarded the Federation Aeronautique International "Gold Air Medal" as the world's outstanding sports pilot, the Institute of Navigation Superior Achievement Award for outstanding performance as a practicing navigator, and the Airline Pilots Association Award for Outstanding Airmanship.
 
Beginning in 1971, Long, and his late wife Marie, interviewed and collected data from over a hundred surviving individuals that had a direct connection with Amelia Earhart's last flight.  Using the data they collected, Long - a former accident investigator for the Airline Pilots Association and Member of the International Society of Air Safety Investigators - used his special expertise in radio communications, navigation, and aircraft operational performance to collaborate with his late wife Marie in writing the book about Amelia Earhart's last flight. In 1976 Long was interviewed by the television program In Search Of... which was hosted by Leonard Nimoy. Long gave his prognosis on Earhart's fate and the positive condition her aircraft would be in, in the deep sea.
 
A Navy veteran who flew in seaplanes throughout the Pacific during World War II, Elgen retired as Senior Boeing 747 Captain from The Flying Tiger Line in 1987, after serving for over forty years as pilot, examiner, instructor, radio operator and navigator.  With a lifetime of aviation experience behind him he has devoted most of his retirement years to researching and writing about Amelia Earhart's last flight.  He led two expeditions to the mid-Pacific Ocean where Earhart disappeared, and in 2006 participated in a search that attempted to locate Amelia's downed aircraft on the ocean floor near Howland Island.
 
Long died in Reno, Nevada, on January 26, 2022, at the age of 94.

Rescue of Yemenite Jews 
While working as a commercial-flight navigator for Alaska Airlines in January 1949, Long received a telegram from company headquarters issuing instructions to make for a British Royal Air Force base in Aden, a port city in Yemen. There, his crew took part in a daring rescue mission Operation Magic Carpet that would come to be known as “On Eagle’s Wings” - a reference to Exodus 19:4 - that airlifted tens of thousands of Yemenite Jews facing persecution and death out of Yemen and into Israel.

Using one aircraft with seats removed to maximize space, Long and his crew completed seven days of non-stop transport from Aden to Tel Aviv. They rested for one day, and then they made five more runs, clocking 12 trips in total.

“On Eagle’s Wings,” also known as “Operation Magic Carpet,” saved 49,000 Yemenite Jews.

References

External links
Official Website of Elgen Long
SeaWord Foundation

1927 births
2022 deaths
20th-century American male writers
20th-century American non-fiction writers
American aviators
Aviation pioneers
United States Navy pilots of World War II
People from McMinnville, Oregon